John Francis Thornell, Jr  (April 19, 1921 – September 3, 1998) was a career officer in the United States Air Force and a World War II flying ace. He flew P-51 Mustangs and P-47 Thunderbolts with the 328th Fighter Squadron of the 352nd Fighter Group. He was the third highest scoring ace of 352nd Fighter Group, and one of the top USAAF aces of the European Theater of Operations and Eighth Air Force, with 17.25 aerial victories and 2 ground victories.

Awards and decorations

  Command pilot

References

1921 births
1998 deaths
People from Stoughton, Massachusetts
United States Air Force officers
American World War II flying aces
Aviators from Massachusetts
Recipients of the Distinguished Service Cross (United States)
Recipients of the Distinguished Flying Cross (United States)
Recipients of the Silver Star
Recipients of the Air Medal
Recipients of the Meritorious Service Medal (United States)
United States Army Air Forces pilots of World War II
Burials at Riverside National Cemetery
Military personnel from Massachusetts